Birutė Ciplijauskaitė (11 April 1929 in Kaunas – 19 June 2017) was a Lithuanian literary scholar and translator. She is considered one of the greatest Hispanists in American academia in the twentieth century. 

The daughter of physician and gynecologist, director of Klaipeda hospital, she attended Kaunas Conservatory and fled Lithuania during World War II. She graduated from the University of Tübingen in 1956 and then the University of Montreal. She received her PhD in Spanish and French from Bryn Mawr College in 1960. Her dissertation, that she wrote under the supervision of Spanish philosopher Jose Ferrater Mora, explored the topic of 'soledad' in twentieth-century Spanish poetry.

Ciplijauskaitė taught Spanish at the University of Wisconsin–Madison from 1960 until 2000, and was a professor from 1968. Ciplijauskaitė has been an adviser for the Lithuanian-American cultural journal Lituanus.

Bibliography
 La soledad en el destierro, Ínsula, 1962
 La soledad y la poesía española contemporánea, Ínsula, 1963
 El poeta y la poesía: del romanticismo a la poesía social, Ínsula, 1966
 (ed.) Luis de Góngora y Argote, Sonetos completos, Castalia, 1968
 Baroja, un estilo, Ínsula, 1972
 Deber de plenitud, la poesía de Jorge Guillén, Secretaría de educación pública, 1973
 Birutė Ciplijauskaitė (ed.), Jorge Guillén, Taurus, 1975
 Birutė Ciplijauskaitė (ed.), Homenaje a Juan Ramón Jiménez, Fundación Universitaria Española, seminario "Ménendez Pelayo, 1982
 Los Noventayochistas y la historia, J. Porrúa Turanzas, 1981
 La mujer insatisfecha : el adulterio en la novela realista, Edhasa, 1984
 Juegos de duplicación e inversión en "La Celestina", Gredos, 1988
 La novela femenina contemporánea 1970-1985 : hacia una tipología de la narración en primera persona, Anthropos, 1988
 Birutė Ciplijauskaitė (ed.), La voluntad de humanismo: homenaje a Juan Marichal, Anthropos, 1990
 Birutė Ciplijauskaitė (ed.), Novísimos, postnovísimos, clásicos: la poesía de los 80 en España, Orígenes, 1991
 Vingt poètes lituaniens d'aujourd'hui, Éditions du Petit Véhicule, 1997
 De signos y significaciones. 1 : poetas del 27, Anthropos, 1999 
 Carmen Martín Gaite (1925-2000), Ediciones del Orto, 2000
 La construcción del yo femenino en la literatura, Universidad de Cádiz. Servicio de publicaciones, 2004

References

1929 births
2017 deaths
Lithuanian literary historians
Lithuanian translators
Writers from Kaunas
Université de Montréal alumni
University of Wisconsin–Madison faculty
Hispanists
20th-century Lithuanian women writers
20th-century Lithuanian writers
Lithuanian women anthropologists
Women literary historians
Lithuanian emigrants to Germany
Canadian emigrants to the United States
20th-century translators